Demidov is the name of several inhabited localities in Russia.

Urban localities
Demidov, Smolensk Oblast, a town under the administrative jurisdiction of Demidovskoye Urban Settlement in Demidovsky District of Smolensk Oblast

Rural localities
Demidov, Volgograd Oblast, a khutor in Demidovsky Selsoviet of Bykovsky District of Volgograd Oblast